Gilliat is a surname. Notable people with the surname include:

Bruce Gilliat, American businessman
Cathy Gilliat-Smith, English hockey player
John Saunders Gilliat, British banker
Martin Gilliat, British soldier
Richard Gilliat, English cricketer
Rosemary Gilliat, Canadian photojournalist
Sidney Gilliat, British film director
Walter Gilliat, British footballer

See also
Gilliat River, Queensland, Australia